Carmel Clark (born 1965 in Lower Hutt) is a former freestyle and backstroke swimmer from New Zealand, who represented her native country in the 1984 Summer Olympics swimming events. She reached the finals in both the 100m and 200m backstroke events, coached by John Beaumont, and finished in eighth place in both finals, also finishing 28th in the 100m freestyle event.

Clark is the daughter of Tony Clark, a former  rugby union representative player and later a schoolteacher. She also competed in four events in the 1986 Commonwealth Games in Edinburgh, finishing fifth in the 200m backstroke and seventh in the 100m backstroke, and participating in the  freestyle relay in which the New Zealand team placed fifth.

References

Living people
Olympic swimmers of New Zealand
New Zealand female freestyle swimmers
Female backstroke swimmers
Swimmers at the 1984 Summer Olympics
New Zealand female swimmers
Sportspeople from Lower Hutt
1965 births
Swimmers at the 1986 Commonwealth Games
Commonwealth Games competitors for New Zealand